Noah Jacob Urrea (born March 31, 2001) is an American singer, actor, composer, dancer and model. He represented USA in the global pop group Now United, which made him known worldwide. In 2022 he left the group to focus on his solo career.

Early life 
Urrea was born in Orange, California on March 31, 2001 to Marco and Wendy Urrea. Noah is of Mexican decent through his father's side and Dutch/French with English, Scottish and German ancestry through his mother's side.

Career

2011–2015: Early acting career 
He had his first chance as an artist in 2011, when he appeared in Blake Shelton's music video, "Honey Bee". In 2012, Urrea was selected as one of Nickelodeon's 'Groundlings', where he developed the talent for improvised comedy.

Urrea made his film debut in 2013 with a role in A Madea Christmas, in which he acted and sang. He played "Bailey McCoy", opposite Tyler Perry, Alicia Witt and Chad Michael Murray. In 2014, Urrea played "Ryan Wade" at the age of 9 in The Identical, another role in which he sang. For his interpretation of Jameses in the 2014 short film Eleven, Urrea won the 'Best Young Actor Award' at the 'Action on Film International Film Festival'. In 2015, Urrea acted as "Cody Mcbride" on Amazon Prime's The Kicks series. Urrea has also appeared in many TV series, including Childrens Hospital, Sam & Cat, Gortimer Gibbon's Life on Normal Street, The Fosters, See Dad Run, Speechless, Nicky, Ricky, Dicky & Dawn and My Super Sweet 16.

2017–present: Early career as a singer, Now United, A Wake, Netflix 
In March 2017, he released his EP, Always. In June 2017, Urrea played the twins Mason and Mitchel in the independent film A Wake which premiered in 2020.

On November 13, 2017, Urrea was revealed as one of the members of Now United, being the fourth revealed at the time. In December of the same year, the group released their first single, "Summer in the City". On April 9, 2020, the song "Wake Up" was released on digital platforms, along with the music video, which was Noah who directed it. On October 18th, 2022, Noah announced his departure of the group to pursue his solo career. On November 14th of the same year, Now United released "Good Intentions", which was his farewell solo song.

In October 2020, Urrea was scheduled to star in a movie on Netflix called Metal Lords, which was released in April 2022. He played Clay Moss.

Filmography

Film

Television

Documentaries

Discography

Extended plays 
 Always (2017)

Singles

Soundtracks

Awards and nominations

References

External links
 
 

2001 births
Living people
American male actors of Mexican descent
American male actors
American male dancers
American male singers
Dancers from California
Male actors from California
Male models from California
Now United members
People from Orange, California
Singers from California
XIX Entertainment artists